This is the episode list of the series KO One (終極一班). It aired on GTV.

Click here to visit the episode guides of the second series The X-Family (終極一家) and the third series K.O.3an Guo (終極三國).

Lists of Taiwanese television series episodes